The AN/APG-81 is an active electronically scanned array (AESA) radar system designed by Northrop Grumman Electronic Systems for the Lockheed Martin F-35 Lightning II.

The Joint Strike Fighter AN/APG-81 AESA radar is a result of the US government's competition for the world's largest AESA acquisition contract. Westinghouse Electronic Systems (acquired by Northrop Grumman in 1996) and Hughes Aircraft (acquired by Raytheon in 1997) received contracts for the development of the Multifunction Integrated RF
System/Multifunction Array (MIRFS/MFA) in February 1996. Lockheed Martin and Northrop Grumman were selected as the winners of the Joint Strike Fighter competition; The System Development and Demonstration (SDD) contract was announced on 26 October 2001.

The AN/APG-81 is a successor radar to the F-22's AN/APG-77. Over three thousand AN/APG-81 AESA radars are expected to be ordered for the F-35, with production to run beyond 2035, and including large quantities of international orders.

Capabilities of the AN/APG-81 include the AN/APG-77's air-to-air modes, plus advanced air-to-ground modes, including high resolution mapping, multiple ground moving target indication and track, combat identification, electronic warfare, and ultra high bandwidth communications. The current F-22 production radar is the APG-77v1, which draws heavily on APG-81 hardware and software for its advanced air-to-ground capabilities.

In August 2005, the APG-81 radar was flown for the first time aboard Northrop Grumman's BAC 1–11 test aircraft. The radar system had accumulated over 300 flight hours by 2010. The first radar flight on Lockheed Martin's CATBird avionics test-bed occurred in November 2008.

In June 2009, the F-35s APG-81 active electronically scanned array radar was integrated in the Northern Edge 2009 large-scale military exercise when it was mounted on the front of a Northrop Grumman test aircraft. The test events "validated years of laboratory testing versus a wide array of threat systems, showcasing the extremely robust electronic warfare capabilities of the world's most advanced fighter fire-control radar."

Announced on 22 June 2010: The radar met and exceeded its performance objectives successfully tracking long-range targets as part of the first mission systems test flights of the F-35 Lightning II BF-4 aircraft.

The AN/APG-81 team won the 2010 David Packard Excellence in Acquisition Award for performance against jammers.

In January 2023 it was reported that the AN/APG-81 would be replaced by a new radar, the AN/APG-85 on Block 4 F-35s. The AN/APG-85 had been mentioned in a budgetary document in December 2022.

References

External links
Northrop Grumman: APG-81
Northrop Grumman YouTube channel's "APG-81 AESA Radar for the F-35 JSF" video

Aircraft radars
Military radars of the United States
Military electronics of the United States
Northrop Grumman radars
Radars of the United States Air Force
Military equipment introduced in the 2000s